Vantage is a hamlet in Sutton Rural Municipality No. 103, Saskatchewan, Canada. Listed as a designated place by Statistics Canada, the hamlet had a reported population of zero in the Canada 2006 Census.

Demographics

Heritage sites 
Vantage Methodist or (Grace United)

The church was built in Vantage in 1917. Vantage Church shared a minister with Mossbank and Ettington. Rev. Bert Howard was the first ordained minister.

See also 
List of communities in Saskatchewan
Hamlets of Saskatchewan

References 

Former designated places in Saskatchewan
Sutton No. 103, Saskatchewan
Hamlets in Saskatchewan
Ghost towns in Saskatchewan
Division No. 3, Saskatchewan